Isabelle Santiago, born 20 September 1965 in Neuilly-sur-Seine, is a French politician. She has been the deputy for Val-de-Marne's 9th constituency in the National Assembly of France since 27 September 2020.

Political career 
In 2011 Santiago was elected general councillor of the Canton of Alfortville-Sud. Until her election to the National Assembly, she was 5th vice-president of Val-de-Marne in charge of the protection of children and adolescents.

Municipal councilor then deputy mayor of Alfortville, she has been departmental councillor of Val-de-Marne since 2 April 2015, elected in the canton of Alfortville.

A by-election was held for Val-de-Marne's 9th constituency in September 2020 because the deputy, Luc Carvounas was ineligible due to cumulation of mandates when he was re-elected Mayor of Alfortville, and his substitute, Sarah Taillebois, was ineligible due to appointment to the École nationale d'administration.
Santiago was elected on 27 September 2020.  
She joined the socialist and associated group.

External links
 Her page on the site of the National Assembly

References

Deputies of the 15th National Assembly of the French Fifth Republic
Living people
1965 births
21st-century French women politicians
Socialist Party (France) politicians
Women members of the National Assembly (France)